Malcolm X Park is the fourth studio album by American rock band Unrest, released in 1988 by Caroline Records.

Critical reception
Exclaim!, in a retrospective review, wrote that the album "teems with restless youth and enthusiasm, which still provide a giddy thrill ride for its listener some 12-years later." Salon thought that "Unrest are like an indie pop version of the Faces, a bunch of sloppy eclectics writing catchy songs and recording them in what must be one take." Trouser Press wrote that "a cover of Kiss’ 'Strutter' denotes both an overly ironic worldview and a discouraging disposition to vapid muscle-flexing, but the rest of the album provides enough of a gray-matter workout to compensate."

Track listing

Personnel
Adapted from the Malcolm X Park liner notes.

Unrest
 Phil Krauth – drums, bass guitar, tambourine, percussion, backing vocals
 Dave Park – bass guitar, electric guitar, acoustic guitar, slide guitar, percussion
 Mark Robinson – lead vocals, electric guitar, bass guitar, piano, acoustic guitar, drums, tambourine, synthesizer, tabla, tambura, percussion

Additional musicians
 Molly Burnham – trumpet (B3)
 Tim Moran – synthesizer (B8)
Production and additional personnel
 Phil Austin – mastering
 Kramer – production, recording

Release history

References

External links 
 

1988 albums
Albums produced by Kramer (musician)
Meridian Hill/Malcolm X Park
TeenBeat Records albums
Unrest (band) albums